Epigraphus is a genus of beetles in the family Carabidae, containing the following species:

 Epigraphus adoxus Basilewsky, 1967 
 Epigraphus amplicollis (Schaum, 1854) 
 Epigraphus arcuatocollis (Murray, 1857) 
 Epigraphus congonicus Basilewsky, 1967 
 Epigraphus differens Basilewsky, 1967 
 Epigraphus fuscicornis (Kolbe, 1883) 
 Epigraphus insolitus Bates, 1886

References

Panagaeinae